Toby Mitchell (born 20 August 1976) is a former professional tennis player from Australia.

Biography
Mitchell was born in the Victorian town of Leongatha but later moved to Queensland where he was based.

A right-handed player, he featured in the main draw of two Australian Open tournaments. As a qualifier he lost to Àlex Corretja in the first round of the 1997 Australian Open and then at the 1999 Australian Open he featured as a wildcard, losing to Byron Black in the opening round.

He retired from professional tennis in 2000.

References

External links
 
 

1976 births
Living people
Australian male tennis players
Tennis people from Queensland
People from Leongatha